Battered sausages are a type of sausage found all across the United Kingdom, Ireland, Australia and New Zealand.

British and Irish battered sausage
The battered sausage is a standard menu item in fish and chip shops across the United Kingdom and Ireland, often described as an "essential" staple of the fish and chip shop menu. They are made up of a pork sausage dipped in batter (usually the same batter used to batter fish), and usually served with chips. A meal of battered sausage and chips is usually known as a 'battered sausage supper' in Scotland.

Australia and New Zealand
In Australia, it may be referred to as a "battered sav" (saveloy is a type of sausage). This may also have given rise to the local expression "fair suck of the sav". In New Zealand, they can be found either with or without a stick inserted (similar to a corn dog). If served with the stick, it is referred to as a hot dog and usually dipped in a generous amount of tomato sauce and consumed immediately. In Australia, this variant may also be referred to as a "pluto pup" or a "dagwood dog."

See also 
 List of Irish dishes
 List of maize dishes
 List of sausage dishes
 List of sausages
 Corn dog
 Red pudding
 Saveloy

References 
 

Irish meat dishes
British sausages
Australian sausages
New Zealand sausages
Maize dishes
Sausage dishes
Cooked sausages